2000 AD may refer to:

 2000, a year in the Anno Domini calendar era
 2000 AD (comics), a weekly British science-fiction comic
 2000 AD (film), a Singapore-Hong Kong action movie
 2000 A.D. (chess variant), a chess variant by V. R. Parton

See also
 2000 (disambiguation)